Francesco Casolla (born 4 April 1992) is an Italian footballer who plays for Avezzano.

Biography
Casolla started his career at Vis Pesaro. ca. 2006–07 season he was signed by Cesena. Casolla was loaned to Bellaria in 2007–08 season for their Allievi team (usually U16 for Lega Pro clubs) He returned to Cesena for their Allievi under-17 team in 2008–09 season. Casolla started his senior career at amateur (non fully professional) club Riccione, a minor team in the Province of Rimini in 2010–11 Serie D. In the next season the club moved to Rimini and renamed as Real Rimini, also in the fifth division. Casolla was a member of Serie D representative team that season.

On 30 August 2011 Casolla returned to Cesena but immediately left for San Marino Calcio in temporary deal with option to sign half of the registration rights. On 21 June 2012 San Marino excised the option for €5,000. During 2012–13 season San Marino acquired Casolla outright for €500.

On 6 August 2013 Casolla was signed by Teramo in another co-ownership deal. Casolla made his debut on 1 September. Casolla played his first start on 7 September. In June 2014 Teramo acquired him outright.

On 18 August 2020 he signed with Serie D club Rimini.

After being registered with Fano, from 9 September 2022 he is a player of Avezzano Calcio, a Serie D club.

References

External links
 AIC profile (data by football.it) 

Italian footballers
A.C. Cesena players
A.S.D. Victor San Marino players
S.S. Teramo Calcio players
Rimini F.C. 1912 players
Alma Juventus Fano 1906 players
Serie C players
Serie D players
Association football forwards
1992 births
Sportspeople from the Province of Rimini
Footballers from Emilia-Romagna
Living people